The Grand Canyon Antelopes women's basketball team represents Grand Canyon University in Phoenix, Arizona. They are a member of the Western Athletic Conference (WAC).

History
GCU began play in 1988, beginning as an NAIA team in District VII. They began play in NCAA Division II in 1991. They joined the Pacific West Conference in 1992 after two years in the Continental Divide Conference. They joined the California Collegiate Athletic Association in 1994, playing in the conference until 2004. After two independent seasons, they joined the Pacific West Conference in 2006. The program underwent the transition to Division I beginning in 2013, joining the Western Athletic Conference on July 1, 2013. The four-year process means that the team cannot be invited nor play in the Division I Tournament until 2018, though they can play in the WNIT or WBI. They were invited to the 2016 Women's Basketball Invitational, losing 57–51 to North Dakota in the First Round. The Antelopes have an all-time record (as of the end of the 2015–16 season) of 367–419, with a 317–381 record outside of Division I.

Postseason

NCAA Division II tournament results
The Antelopes made six appearances in the NCAA Division II women's basketball tournament. They had a combined record of 4–6.

References

External links